Davies's big-eared bat or the graybeard bat (Glyphonycteris daviesi) is a species of bat in the family Phyllostomidae. It is named after James (Jim) Noel Davies (B. 1936) who discovered it whilst on an expedition in British Guiana, South America (Guyana since 1966) in 1963. This was the Cambridge University expedition to the rainforest reserve near Bartica in British Guiana.  This species can weigh 30 grams and has a wingspan of up to 50cm.  It is bigger than most micronycteris bats with a fierce disposition. A small frog was found in the stomach of a specimen, and the bat is strong-willed enough to chew its way out of a cloth bag.

The species is found across the tropical regions of South America, including Brazil, Colombia, Costa Rica, Ecuador, French Guiana, Guyana, Honduras, Panama, Peru, Suriname, Trinidad and Tobago, and Venezuela.  It is recorded (2021) in the Eponym Dictionary, published by Johns Hopkins University of Baltimore USA.

References

Glyphonycteris
Mammals of Colombia
Bats of Central America
Mammals described in 1964
Taxonomy articles created by Polbot